Nabinagar is an upazila of Brahmanbaria District in the Division of Chattogram, Bangladesh. Nabinagar Thana was turned into an upazila in 1983.

Geography
It has 94,871 households and a total area of 86,568 acres (350.328 km2).

Demographics
According to the 2011 Bangladesh census, Nabinagar had a population of 493,518. This comprised 230,227 males and 263,291 females, with males constituting 46.65% of the population, and females 53.35%. Nabinagar has an average literacy rate of 43.60%, comprising 42.80% among males and 44.30% among females. Bangladesh Bureau of Statistics

Points of interest
 Masque made by Alauddin Kha
Satmora Aanada Ashram 
 Shrighar Church
 Bholachnag Palpara Doyamoy mandir 
 Ahammadpur Soldiers memorials
 Goni Shah Mazar Sharif Thollakandi
 Maharshi Mon Mohon Datta Monastery
 Barikhola Abdul Gofur chisti & Shiraj Chisti mazar
 Titusha Mazar Sorif Lohory
 MP Tila
 SantiPur Kath Bagan
 Rasulpur Natghar
 Ibrahimpur Dayami Darbar sharif (sufiyabad)
 Titas River

Administration
Nabinagar Upazila is divided into Nabinagar Municipality and 21 union parishads: Barail, Barikandi, Biddyakut, Birgaon, Bitghar, Ibrahimpur, Junedpur, Kaitala Dakshin, Kaitala Uttar, Krishnanagar, Laur Fatehpur, Natghar, Paschim Nabinagar, Purba Nabinagar, Rasullabad, Ratanpur, Salimganj, Satmura, Shibpur, Shyamgram, and Sreerampur. The union parishads are subdivided into 149 mauzas and 200 villages.

Nabinagar Municipality is subdivided into 9 wards and 18 mahallas.

The current Member of Parliament is Mohammad Ebadul Karim Bulbul( Brahmanbaria-5)

Post offices and postal codes
 Nabinagar - 3410
 Sreerampur - 3410
 Rasullabad - 3412
 Jibanganj - 3419
 Kaitala - 3417
 Laurfatehpur - 3411
 Ratanpur - 3414
 Salimganj - 3418
 Shahapur - 3415
 Shamgram - 3413
 Fandauk - 3441
 Nasirnagar - 3440
 Satmora - 3544
 Birgoan - 3400
 krisnonogoar - 3400
 Barail - 3444
 shibpur - 3400
 Brahmanhata - 3417
 Kalghara - 3413
 Ibrahimpur - 3410
 Vulachang - 3410
 Jenodpur -3410

Education
There are 4 colleges, 25 high schools, 8 Madrasas, 144 government primary schools and 55 non-government primary schools. According to Banglapedia, Nabinagar Pilot High School, founded in 1896, Bidyakut Amar High School (1913), Fatehpur Kamalakanta Gurucharan High School (1913) and Kaitala Jajneshwar High School (1918) are notable secondary schools.

Notable people
Ghulam Azam, former leader of Bangladesh Jamaat-e-Islami
Khan Sarwar Murshid, sixth vice-chancellor of the University of Rajshahi

See also
 Upazilas of Bangladesh
 Districts of Bangladesh
 Divisions of Bangladesh
 Dobachil, Nabinagar Bangladesh

References

External links
 Nabinagarupazila.com
 nabinagar.brahmanbaria.gov

 
Upazilas of Brahmanbaria District